Joseph William Tobin, CSsR, (born May 3, 1952) is an American prelate of the Roman Catholic Church. A member of the Redemptorist order, he has been the archbishop of Archdiocese of Newark in New Jersey, since 2017. He previously served as the archbishop of Archdiocese of Indianapolis in Indiana from 2012 to 2016 and as secretary of the Congregation for Institutes of Consecrated Life and Societies of Apostolic Life (CICLSAL) from 2010 to 2012. He has been a cardinal since November 19, 2016.

Early life and education
Joseph Tobin was born in Detroit, Michigan, in 1952, the oldest of the 13 children of Joseph W. Tobin and Marie Terese Kerwin. He was baptized five days after his birth at the Church of the Most Holy Redeemer in Detroit, founded and administered by the Congregation of the Most Holy Redeemer (Redemptorists). He later attended the parochial school at the church.

By the time he had graduated, Tobin felt called to serve as a Catholic priest and applied to join the Redemptorists, who accepted him as a candidate. He then attended St. Joseph's Preparatory College in Edgerton, Wisconsin, the Redemptorist minor seminary. After graduating in 1970, he was received into the Redemptorist novitiate of to begin his formation as a member. He made his temporary profession of religious vows as a member of the Redemptorists on August 5, 1972, and his perpetual vows on August 21, 1976.

In 1975, Tobin received a Bachelor of Philosophy degree from Holy Redeemer College in Waterford, Wisconsin.  He then studied at Mount St. Alphonsus Seminary in Esopus, New York, earning a Master of Religious Education degree in 1977 and a Master of Divinity degree in pastoral theology in 1979.

Ordination and ministry

Tobin was ordained a priest for the Redemptorist Order by Archbishop William Cousins at Holy Redeemer College on June 1, 1978. The following year, Tobin returned to Detroit, where he was appointed the parochial vicar of Holy Redeemer Parish. He was later named pastor there, serving from 1984 to 1990. From 1980 to 1986, he served as an episcopal vicar for the Archdiocese of Detroit, and also assisted at the local diocesan marriage tribunal. From 1990 to 1991, Tobin served as pastor of St. Alphonsus Parish in Chicago, Illinois.

Tobin was elected general consultor of the Redemptorists in 1991 and on September 9, 1997, was elected superior general. He was confirmed for a second term as superior general on September 26, 2003. That same year, he became vice-president of the Union of Superiors General. He was also a member of the Council for Relations between the Congregation for Institutes of Consecrated Life and Societies of Apostolic Life and the International Union of Superiors General from 2001 to 2009.

In 2005, Tobin participated in a Synod of Bishops in Rome, where he spent a week in a Spanish-language discussion group that included the archbishop of Buenos Aires, who later became Pope Francis and would name Tobin a cardinal.

Tobin spent 2010 taking a sabbatical attached to Blackfriars Hall Priory in Oxford, England, residing with the De La Salle Brothers. He pursued his interest in the rise of secularization and secular culture, attending seminars by anthropologist Peter B. Clarke, studying at the Las Casas Institute and taking classes at Blackfriars. Tobin speaks English, Spanish, French, Italian, and Portuguese.

Roman Curia
In May 2009, Tobin was named to oversee the professed men's element of the Apostolic Visitation of the Church in Ireland, scheduled for September 2010. On August 2, 2010, Tobin was appointed secretary of the Congregation for Institutes of Consecrated Life and Societies of Apostolic Life (CICLSAL) and titular archbishop of Obba. Tobin was the second American cleric to head CICLSAL.Tobin learned of his appointment two weeks before it was announced. He recalled:

Tobin received his episcopal consecration in Rome on October 9, 2010. He had said:

When Tobin arrived at CICLSAL, it was already conducting a visitation—a critical inspection of ministries and organization—of the 341 institutes of apostolic women religious in the United States. At the same time, the Congregation for the Doctrine of the Faith (CDF) was conducting a doctrinal assessment of the Leadership Conference of Women Religious (LCWR), focused on its theological orthodoxy. In December 2010, Tobin said that the Holy See needed to acknowledge the "depth of anger and hurt" among the nuns that was provoked by the CDF visitation, saying it illustrated the need for a "strategy of reconciliation" with women religious. The CDF issued its report on the LCWR in April 2012; Tobin was reportedly unhappy both with its content and with the failure of the CDF to consult him before releasing it.

Archbishop of Indianapolis

On October 18, 2012, Pope Benedict XVI appointed Tobin as archbishop of the Archdiocese of Indianapolis, a Catholic community of 246,000. He was installed on December 3, 2012. His reassignment from the Curia had been rumored since Tobin expressed his unhappiness with the CDF's highly critical report on the LCWR in April 2012.

In June 2014, Tobin warned that ideological polarization of American political life "helps to contribute to the balkanization of American Catholics into so-called right wing and left wing, or progressive and traditionalist, factions, who point fingers at each other". Speaking at a meeting of the College Theology Society, he said that: "In my opinion, finger pointing does a great harm to religious life because it makes us defensive ... [and] we feel constantly compelled to defend ourselves against other parties in the church."

In May 2016, Tobin was named to oversee the Sodalitium Christianae Vitae, a religious community that a Vatican review had found in need of thorough-going reform.

Cardinal
On October 9, 2016, Pope Francis announced that Tobin would be made a cardinal in a papal consistory to be held on November 19, 2016. On that day, he was made a cardinal-priest of Santa Maria delle Grazie a Via Trionfale. Pope Francis named Tobin a member of the Pontifical Council for Culture on November 11, 2019, a member of the Congregation for Bishops on March 4, 2021 and a member of the Supreme Tribunal of the Apostolic Signatura on June 21, 2021.

Archbishop of Newark

Appointment and tenure
On November 7, 2016, Pope Francis named Tobin as archbishop of the Archdiocese of Newark, a city which has, like Indianapolis, never before been headed by a cardinal. He was installed there on January 6, 2017.

Tobin is a strong advocate of increased acceptance of migrants into the United States and of a lenient position towards undocumented immigrants. In March 2017, he accompanied 59-year old Catalino Guerrero, an undocumented immigrant, to his deportation hearing. In May 2018, Tobin called on Catholic leaders to resist the immigration positions of President Donald Trump, saying, "you really have to believe in inflicting cruelty on innocent people to choose to support the policies we've seen in recent months."

Tobin has been a proponent of increasing the role of women in the Catholic Church. In an interview with The New York Times published on December 22, 2017, Tobin said that he "understand[s] the consternation" among women who find themselves frustrated that they are not permitted to become priests. When asked about the possibility of a female cardinal, he responded, "Maybe my theology isn't sophisticated enough, but I don't believe that there's a compelling theological reason why the pope couldn't name a woman cardinal."

LGBT issues
Tobin welcomed a "pilgrimage" of gay and lesbian Catholics and their families to the archdiocese's cathedral in 2017. In an interview before the Mass, Tobin said, "The word I use is 'welcome'. These are people that have not felt welcome in other places. My prayer for them is that they do. Today in the Catholic Church, we read a passage that says you have to be able to give a reason for your hope. And I'm praying that this pilgrimage for them, and really for the whole Church, is a reason for hope."

In an interview with NBC's Anne Thompson on April 17, 2019, Tobin said: "The Church, I think, is having its own conversation about what our faith has us do and say with people in relationships that are same-sex. What should be without debate is that we are called to welcome them." Tobin was then asked about language in the Catechism of the Catholic Church that refers to homosexuality as "intrinsically disordered." Tobin answered, "Well I don't call them 'intrinsically disordered' ... It's very unfortunate language. Let's hope that eventually that language is a little less hurtful."

Tobin supported the 2017 book called Building a Bridge, by Father James Martin, SJ, which called for the church to modify its relationship with LGBT people. Tobin commented that "in too many parts of our church, LGBT people have been made to feel unwelcome, excluded, and even shamed. Father Martin's brave, prophetic, and inspiring new book marks an essential step in inviting church leaders to minister with more compassion, and in reminding LGBT Catholics that they are as much a part of our church as any other Catholic."

Clergy sex abuse
On August 17, 2018, the Catholic News Agency reported that six Newark priests had alleged experiences of sexual misconduct by two priests in seminary and ministry in the archdiocese. Tobin responded with a letter to the priests of Newark on the same day, saying that he had been unaware of the issue. He concluded the letter by encouraging priests to refer media inquiries to the archdiocesan director of communications.

On August 25, 2018, Archbishop Carlo Maria Viganò, former apostolic nuncio to the United States, released a letter describing a series of warnings to the Vatican regarding alleged sexual misconduct by then-cardinal Theodore McCarrick, a predecessor of Tobin in Newark. Viganò claimed that McCarrick "orchestrated" the appointment of Tobin as Archbishop of Newark. Tobin denounced Viganò's statement for "factual errors, innuendo and fearful ideology." He said that the letter "cannot be understood as contributing to the healing of survivors of sexual abuse" and called for "guaranteeing a safe and respectful environment where all are welcome and breaking down the structures and cultures that enable abuse."

One journalist claims that in a conversation with Tobin that he said that around the time he came to Newark in 2016 he heard "rumors" about McCarrick having slept with seminarians, but chose not to believe them, stating that at the time they seemed too "incredulous" to be true.

See also

 Catholic Church hierarchy
 Catholic Church in the United States
 Historical list of the Catholic bishops of the United States
 List of Catholic bishops of the United States
 Lists of patriarchs, archbishops, and bishops

Notes

References

External links
 
 
Official website of the Archdiocese of Newark

1952 births
Living people
Clergy from Detroit
Redemptorists
Mount St. Alphonsus Seminary alumni
21st-century American cardinals
Members of the Congregation for Institutes of Consecrated Life and Societies of Apostolic Life
Roman Catholic archbishops of Indianapolis
Redemptorist bishops
Redemptorist cardinals
Cardinals created by Pope Francis
Roman Catholic archbishops of Newark